Rodney is an American television sitcom starring stand-up comic and country music singer Rodney Carrington that aired on ABC from September 21, 2004, to June 6, 2006. Executive producer Ric Swartzlander, Don Reo, and Damon Wayans were the creators of the series.

Premise
The show's story revolves around the character Rodney Hamilton (Rodney Carrington) who wishes to leave his horrible job in Tulsa, Oklahoma, to become a stand-up comedian.

Rodney's daily life revolves around his family – his wife Trina (Jennifer Aspen) and his sons Jack (Oliver Davis) and Bo (Matthew Josten). He also spends a lot of time with his best friend Barry Martin (Nick Searcy) who constantly tries to escape his wife Genie, and with his crazy sister-in-law Charlie (Amy Pietz).

One recurring character is Trina's father, Carl (Mac Davis), who is constantly lending or giving the family money, much to Rodney's dismay.

Another recurring character is police officer Gerald Bob (Jon Reep), who has a sexual relationship with Charlie.

Cast and characters

Main characters
 Rodney Hamilton  (Rodney Carrington)
 Trina Hamilton   (Jennifer Aspen) – Rodney's wife
 Barry  (Nick Searcy) – Rodney's friend
 Jack Hamilton  (Oliver Davis) – Rodney's son
 Bo Hamilton  (Matthew Josten) – Rodney's son
 Charlie  (Amy Pietz) – Trina's sister

Recurring characters

 Gerald Bob  (Jon Reep) – local law enforcement officer
 Carl   (Mac Davis) – Trina's father

Episodes

Season 1 (2004–05)

Season 2 (2005–06)

Airings

Other than in the US, the show also began broadcasting in the UK on ABC1 on May 31, 2005, in Australia on the Seven Network on August 17, 2006, and in the Netherlands on June 9, 2008. The final six episodes were not aired in the United States, however they were shown in Australia on the Seven network in October 2006 and on ABC1 in the UK (before that channel closed in 2007). In Poland it premiered on Comedy Central Family (former VH1) on May 14, 2011.

American ratings

Home media
Season 1 of the series was released exclusively to Wal-Mart on May 5, 2009. The set included all 22 episodes and presented in widescreen. The second and final season DVD-Box was released on October 6, 2009 and includes all 22 episodes, even those not aired by ABC.

References

External links
 

2000s American sitcoms
2004 American television series debuts
2006 American television series endings
American Broadcasting Company original programming
Television shows set in Tulsa, Oklahoma
Television series by ABC Studios
English-language television shows